The European Express Tour was the European leg of Elton John's 1984 Breaking Hearts Tour.

Background
The European Express Tour, which was a continuation of the Too Low for Zero Tour of Oceania took place across three months during the summer of 1984. The tour included several countries that Elton and his band had not previously performed in. This included Poland, Czechoslovakia, Hungary Yugoslavia, Italy, Austria and Spain.

The tour came to an end at London's Wembley Stadium on 30 June 1984. This concert was recorded for broadcast on the U.S. Showtime cable network and Britain's BBC Radio 1. The performance was later released on VHS as Night and Day Concert.

Set list
This set list is representative of the performance on 28 May 1984 in Paris, France. It does not represent the set list at all concerts for the duration of the tour.

"Tiny Dancer"
"Hercules"
"Rocket Man"
"Daniel"
"Restless"
"Candle in the Wind"
"The Bitch Is Back"
"Don't Let the Sun Go Down on Me"
"Sad Songs (Say So Much)"
"Bennie and the Jets"
"Sorry Seems to Be the Hardest Word"
"Philadelphia Freedom"
"Blue Eyes"
"I Guess That's Why They Call It the Blues"
"Kiss the Bride"
"One More Arrow"
"Too Low for Zero"
"I'm Still Standing"
"Your Song"
"Saturday Night's Alright for Fighting"
"Crocodile Rock"
Encore
"Song for Guy" or "Medley: Whole Lotta Shakin’ Goin On / I Saw Her Standing There / Twist and Shout."

Tour dates

Tour band
Elton John – piano, lead vocals
Davey Johnstone – guitars, backing vocals
Dee Murray – guitar, backing vocals
Nigel Olsson – drums, backing vocals
Fred Mandel – keyboards, additional guitar, backing vocals

Notes

References

External links

 Information Site with Tour Dates

Elton John concert tours
1984 concert tours